The 1978 Michigan gubernatorial election was held on November 7, 1978.
Incumbent Republican William Milliken was elected to a third term as Michigan Governor.

, this remains the last election in which the Republican candidate for Governor carried Wayne County.

Primary elections
The primary elections occurred on August 8, 1978.

Democratic primary

Republican primary

General election

Results

References

1978
Governor
Michigan
November 1978 events in the United States